Cherni Vit ("Black Vit"") is a village in Teteven Municipality, Lovech Province, north central Bulgaria. The village is known for its local kind of green cheese, known as Cherni Vit cheese.

Villages in Lovech Province